The Undertow is a lost 1916 American silent drama film directed by Frank Thorne starring Franklin Ritchie, Helene Rosson, and Eugenie Forde. It was released by the Mutual Film Company.

Cast
 Franklin Ritchie as James King
 Helene Rosson as Esther
 Eugenie Forde as Mrs. King
 Orral Humphrey as Hammond
 Harry von Meter as John Morden
 George Ahearn as David Strong
 Ogden Childe
 Joseph De Grasse

References

External links

1916 films
1916 drama films
Silent American drama films
American silent feature films
American black-and-white films
1910s American films